The Alberts, The Bonzo Dog Doo Dah Band, The Temperance Seven is a singles compilation album released in 1971, notable for the first time both sides of the first two Bonzo Dog Doo-Dah Band singles were released in stereo.

Track listing

Side one 
  "You're Driving Me Crazy" — The Temperance Seven
  "Charley My Boy" — The Temperance Seven
  "Thanks for the Melody "— The Temperance Seven
  "P.C.Q. (Please Charleston Quietly)" — The Temperance Seven
  "Button up your Overcoat" — The Bonzo Dog Doo Dah Band
  "My Brother Makes the Noises for the Talkies" — The Bonzo Dog Doo Dah Band
  "Morse Code Melody" — The Alberts

Side two 
  "Pasadena" — The Temperance Seven
  "Sugar" — The Temperance Seven
  "Easy Money" — The Temperance Seven
  "The Shake" — The Temperance Seven
  "I'm Gonna Bring a Watermelon to my Girl Tonight" — The Bonzo Dog Doo Dah Band
  "Alley Oop" — The Bonzo Dog Doo Dah Band
  "Sleepy Valley" — The Alberts

External links 
 

Bonzo Dog Doo-Dah Band compilation albums
Alberts
Split albums
The Temperance Seven albums
The Alberts albums